Ella Fitzgerald Sings the Johnny Mercer Song Book is a 1964 studio album by the American jazz singer Ella Fitzgerald, with the Nelson Riddle Orchestra, focusing on the songs of Johnny Mercer. It was recorded in Los Angeles, California.  This is Fitzgerald's fifth and final collaboration with Riddle during her years on the Verve label.

The album is notable as Fitzgerald's only Song Book to concentrate on the work of a lyricist. Riddle's lush arrangements interact most beautifully with Fitzgerald on ballads like "Midnight Sun" and "Skylark". Fitzgerald's impeccable swing is most evident on "Something's Gotta Give" and "Too Marvelous for Words".

Track listing
For the 1964 Verve LP release; Verve V6-4067; Re-issued in 1984 on CD, Verve-PolyGram 823 247-2

Side One:
"Too Marvelous for Words" (Richard A. Whiting)  – 2:31
"Early Autumn" (Ralph Burns)  – 3:51
"Day In, Day Out" (Rube Bloom)  – 2:49
"Laura" (from the film Laura) (David Raksin)  – 3:43
"This Time the Dream's on Me" (Harold Arlen)  – 2:54
"Skylark" (Hoagy Carmichael)  – 3:12
"Single-O" (Donald Kahn, Johnny Mercer)  – 3:19

Side Two:
"Something's Gotta Give" (Mercer)  – 2:33
"Trav'lin' Light" (Jimmy Mundy, Trummy Young)  – 3:47
"Midnight Sun" (Francis J. Burke, Lionel Hampton)  – 4:55
"Dream" (Mercer)  – 2:58
"I Remember You" (Victor Schertzinger)  – 3:38
"When a Woman Loves a Man" (Bernie Hanighen, Gordon Jenkins)  – 3:51

All lyrics by Johnny Mercer, composers between brackets.

Personnel 
Recorded October 19–21, 1964 at Radio Recorders Studio 10-H, Hollywood:

 Ella Fitzgerald - Vocals
 Nelson Riddle, arranger and conductor
 Paul Smith on piano
 Plas Johnson on tenor sax
 Willie Smith on alto sax
 Buddy DeFranco on clarinet
 Frank Flynn on vibes
 Val Valentin, recording engineer

References

1964 albums
Ella Fitzgerald albums
Verve Records albums
Albums produced by Norman Granz
Albums arranged by Nelson Riddle
Johnny Mercer tribute albums
Albums conducted by Nelson Riddle